Lago di Piano is a lake in the Province of Como, Lombardy, Italy.

Lakes of Lombardy